Nemanja Milovanović (born 12 June 1991) is a Serbian football midfielder who plays for Napredak Kruševac.

References

External links
 
 

1991 births
Living people
Sportspeople from Kruševac
Association football midfielders
Serbian footballers
Serbian expatriate footballers
Serbian First League players
Serbian SuperLiga players
Maltese Premier League players
Belarusian Premier League players
FK Napredak Kruševac players
FK Teleoptik players
FK Mladost Lučani players
Mosta F.C. players
Gżira United F.C. players
FK BSK Borča players
FC Gorodeya players
FK Mačva Šabac players
FK Dinamo Vranje players
FK Javor Ivanjica players
OFK Bačka players
FK Kolubara players
Serbian expatriate sportspeople in Malta
Serbian expatriate sportspeople in Belarus
Expatriate footballers in Malta
Expatriate footballers in Belarus